Mohammad Ali Baig is an Indian theatre personality and film maker of ad and documentary films, referred to by the media as 'Global Face of Hyderabadi Theatre', 'Sultan of Epics' and 'Master of Revival'. He is the recipient of the Padmashri He founded the Qadir Ali Baig Theatre Foundation in Hyderabad in 2005, as a tribute to his father, theatre legend late Qadir Ali Baig. In April 2014, he was awarded Padma Shri, the fourth highest civilian award in India, in 2014 for his contributions in theatre arts.

Born into one of the most prominent theatre families in India, the playwright-director-actor remains passionately devoted to the illustrious family legacy. The Qadir Ali Baig Theatre Foundation is dedicated to promoting meaningful theatre in Hyderabad. He is the founder-curator of Qadir Ali Baig Theatre Festival, one of the most prestigious theatre festivals in the country, held annually in Hyderabad during October–November. 

Various global honours (French Honour in Paris, Awards for Global Excellence in Theatre in Toronto and Chicago, Retrospectives in Turkey, UK and USA) have been for his kind of theatre that makes history contemporary, fantasy realistic and multiculturalism chic. His heritage-based theatre productions have been the toast of several international festivals in India, Canada, France, Pakistan, Turkey, USA and UK.  His theatre is modeled on his father’s Spectacle Theatre, performed at iconic venues; forts, palaces and stadiums, drawing large-number turnouts. He is credited for single-handedly reviving theatre in Hyderabad over the past decade. As an advertising and documentary filmmaker, he has over 450 productions to his credit, bringing him over 40 awards for creative excellence globally.

Early life
Mohammad Ali Baig was born to renowned theatre personality, Qadir Ali Baig in Hyderabad and Begum Razia Baig, who is Chairperson of the Qadir Ali Baig Theatre Foundation. Mohammad Ali Baig traversed almost the entire gamut of Indian theatre as a child, and avant-garde world theatre as a teenager.

Career
At an age when most youngsters would be stepping out of film school and beginning to assist senior filmmakers, Mohammad Ali Baig was already directing stalwarts in the industry as an advertising film maker, and became the youngest director-on-board of India’s pioneering public limited TV and films production company, Odyssey in Bangalore.

Mohammad Ali Baig has produced and directed over 400 advertising and corporate films for leading Indian and foreign brands in India, Thailand, and in other countries. His ad films, short films, and social documentaries have been telecast around the world; from Doordarshan in India to BBC in UK, Discovery Channel in USA, CNN and Moscow Television in Russia.

He formed the ‘Qadir Ali Baig Theatre Foundation’ in 2005 along with his mother Begum Razia Baig and Lakshmi Devi Raj, as a tribute to his legendary father and to revive quality theatre in Hyderabad. One of the most experienced and prominent names in Indian theatre today, His own productions include: South India’s biggest original musical production in Hindustani, ‘Taramati- The Legend of an Artist’, ‘His Exalted Highness’, ‘Reading Between the Lines’, ‘Raat Phoolon Ki’, ‘Resham Ki Dor’, ‘Pankhdiyaan’, ‘Aaina’, ‘Dada Saheb Phalke’, ‘Quli: Dilon ka Shahzaada', ‘Savaan-e-Hayat’, 'Spaces' and '1857: Turrebaz Khan'.

'Quli : Dilon ka Shahzaada', 'Savaan-e-Hayat', 'Spaces' (co-written by and also featuring Baig's wife, writer-actor Noor Baig) have been feted at prestigious festivals and venues in India, Canada, France, Turkey, UK and USA. 'Quli: Dilon ka Shahzaada' has a successful week-long run at Edinburgh Festival Fringe 2016. His latest play '1857: Turrebaz Khan' had its world premiere there, followed by a premiere in London. 

He acted in 3 Tamil films Aruvi in 2016, Cobra 2022 and Sardar (2022), where he played a pivotal role. 

He appeared in the 2021 Aha web series In the Name of God,Aha Naa Pellanta (web series).

Awards 
He has won the highly celebrated and acclaimed global award for his heritage film ‘Rockumentary’. He has to his credit 30 advertising awards, 2 National Honours, and 2 International Golds. He has also won the Indira Gandhi Award for young achievers in the field of Visual communications, besides several other prestigious awards. He has also received Honours for his contribution to theatre by the French (2010) and Canadian Governments (2014). He has also been accorded Retrospectives of his plays in Turkey and London.

In April 2014, he was awarded Padma Shri, the fourth highest civilian award in India, in 2014 for his contributions in theatre arts.

References
http://www.baigtheatrefoundation.com/

Indian theatre directors
Indian theatre managers and producers
Film directors from Hyderabad, India
Living people
Recipients of the Padma Shri in arts
20th-century Indian film directors
Year of birth missing (living people)